Claviporella is a genus of bryozoans belonging to the family Catenicellidae.

The species of this genus are found in Australia and New Zealand.

Species:

Claviporella airensis 
Claviporella angusta 
Claviporella aurita 
Claviporella bicornis 
Claviporella geminata 
Claviporella goldsteini 
Claviporella imperforata 
Claviporella longicollis 
Claviporella marionae 
Claviporella obliqua 
Claviporella pulchra 
Claviporella pusilla

References

Bryozoan genera